Tipton Female Seminary was a female seminary opened in 1854 in Covington, Tennessee.

History 
Tipton Female Academy was founded in 1854, and led from 1857 to 1868 by Rev. James Holmes (1801–1873). James Holmes had founded Mountain Academy in 1832 in Tipton County and led it for about 15 years. From 1849 until 1857, he served as president of West Tennessee College at Jackson. Holmes was principal of Tipton Female Academy from 1857 to 1868. On April 23, 1861, the "Southern Confederates" group met at the school, for an organizational meeting. 

In 1868, James Holmes was succeeded by his son, George Duffield Holmes (1831–1894). In 1891, the school presented awards during commencement for scholarship, music, dictation, penmanship, and punctuality.

The school catalogue for 1888–1889 is held by the University of Memphis, and the June 6, 1894 school commencement program is extant.

Alumni
Frances Boyd Calhoun, teacher, poet, and author of Miss Minerva and William Green Hill

References

Covington, Tennessee
1854 establishments in Tennessee
Female seminaries in the United States